The 2014–15 Hannover 96 season is the 119th season in the club's football history. In 2014–15 the club plays in the Bundesliga, the premier tier of German football. It is the club's 12th season in this league, having been promoted from the 2. Fußball-Bundesliga in 2002.

Squad
As of 1 September 2014

Players out on loan

Transfers

In

Out

Competitions

Bundesliga

League table

Results summary

Results by round

Matches

DFB-Pokal

Statistics

Goalscorers

Last updated: 23 May 2015

Clean sheets

Last updated: 23 May 2015

Disciplinary record

Last updated: 23 May 2015

References

Hannover 96
Hannover 96 seasons